Middleton Cheney was a rural district in Northamptonshire, England from 1894 to 1935.

It was formed under the Local Government Act 1894 from that part of the Banbury rural sanitary district which was in Northamptonshire (the main part in Oxfordshire becoming the Banbury Rural District).  It was named after the village of Middleton Cheney.

The district was abolished in 1935 under a County Review Order, and its area added to the existing Brackley Rural District.

See also
History of Banbury

References
https://web.archive.org/web/20070930232013/http://www.visionofbritain.org.uk/relationships.jsp?u_id=10206248

History of Northamptonshire
Local government in Northamptonshire
Banbury
Districts of England created by the Local Government Act 1894
1935 disestablishments in the United Kingdom
Rural districts of England